Krasny Istok is a rural locality (a selo) in Leninsky Selsoviet of Arkharinsky District, Amur Oblast, Russia. The population was 53 in 2018. There are 3 streets.

Geography 
Krasny Istok is located 23 km south of Arkhara (the district's administrative centre) by road. Orlovka is the nearest rural locality.

References 

Rural localities in Arkharinsky District